The Pakistan women's national swimming team represents Pakistan in international swimming competitions. It is administered by the Pakistan Swimming Federation (PSF). Members of the team compete at competitions including the continental and regional games (Asian and South Asian Games) and championships. Members have also participated at the Olympics with Rubab Raza the first ever female Pakistani swimmer to do so when she competed at the  2004 Games in Athens, Greece.

History
Due to a ban by the Government of Pakistan, women were not allowed to compete internationally until the early 2000s. The Secretary of PSF, Veena Salman Masud petitioned the government to allow them to compete as long as they respected cultural and religious norms.

Events
Pakistan has sent a team to the following competitions.

Championships
 World Aquatics Championships: 2019

Games
 Olympics: 2004 to date (individuals on quota places)
 Asian Games: 2018
 South Asian Games: 2004 to date

Members

References

Pakistan women's team
Women's national team
Swimming
Women's sport in Pakistan